The Fajr-27 system is an Iranian unlicensed copy of the Italian OTO Melara 76mm naval gun.

The system was publicly unveiled for the first time in September 2006.

See also
Military of Iran
Iranian military industry
Current Equipment of the Iranian Army

References

Artillery of Iran
Post–Cold War weapons of Iran
Autocannon
Naval artillery
76 mm artillery
Military equipment introduced in the 2000s